Mark Adam Hensby (born 29 June 1971) is an Australian professional golfer.

Early years and amateur career
Hensby was born in Melbourne, Victoria. Australia. He grew up with his parents and two brothers, Darren and Jason, in Tamworth, New South Wales.  When he was young, his parents divorced. 

Hensby first played golf when 12 years old and reached handicap 3 within two years. He attended Tamworth High School, leaving at the age of 16 to work as a postie while spending most of his time on the golf course.

He moved to the United States in 1994, and having initially stayed with family friends, for a time slept in his car parked at the Cog Hill Golf & Country Club near Chicago, Illinois. He won the Illinois State Amateur Championship in 1994 before turning professional the following year.

Professional career
Hensby played on what is now the Korn Ferry Tour (at the time named the Nike Tour and later the Buy.com Tour) from 1997 before he graduated to the PGA Tour for the 2001 season. He gained his place on the elite tour by virtue of his 2nd-place finish on the Buy.com Tour money list in 2000. In his rookie season, Hensby did not earn enough money to retain his card and was forced to return to the second tier for 2002, after failing to regain his place at the end of season qualifying school. In 2003, he picked up his third win on second tier tour, now named the Nationwide Tour, and finished 7th on the money list, to graduate directly to the PGA Tour for the second time.

2004 was a breakthrough season for Hensby as he sought to establish himself on the PGA Tour. He collected his first win at the 2004 John Deere Classic, where he defeated John E. Morgan in a sudden-death playoff, and also had several other top 10 finishes on his way to 15th place on the end of season money list. The following season, he made an impact in the majors, finishing tied for 5th at the Masters, tied for 3rd in the U.S. Open, and tied for 15th at The Open at St Andrews, Scotland, after being second behind eventual winner Tiger Woods after the first round. In 2005, Hensby made the cut in all four majors. He also won the Scandinavian Masters on the European Tour after beating Henrik Stenson in a playoff on Stensons home soil in Stockholm, Sweden, after Hensby had birdied the last two holes in regulation to force a playoff. He advanced to a career high 27th in the Official World Golf Ranking during 2005. He was awarded with a spot in the 2005 Presidents Cup International team.

A car accident early in 2006 severely limited Hensby's ability to compete that year, but he came back in 2007 to finish just outside the top 100 on the PGA Tour money list and secure his card for following season. His struggles were not over however and in 2008, he slipped outside the top 150 to lose his fully exempt status.

A series of injuries and three shoulder surgeries, plus two failed attempts at European Tour Q School, halted Hensby's career. He made his first PGA Tour start in two years (and first cut on any major tour since 2011) at the 2015 Barbasol Championship. He was the co-leader at the 36-hole point with rookie Kim Meen-whee. Hensby finished T6, his first PGA Tour top ten finish in seven years.

In December 2017, the PGA Tour suspended Hensby for one year retroactive to 26 October for violating the Tour's anti-doping policy. Hensby spoke out a day afterwards, saying: "Call me stupid but don’t call me a cheater."

Amateur wins
1994 Illinois State Amateur Championship

Professional wins (6)

PGA Tour wins (1)

PGA Tour playoff record (1–0)

European Tour wins (1)

European Tour playoff record (1–0)

Nationwide Tour wins (3)

Nationwide Tour playoff record (2–1)

Other wins (1)
1996 Illinois Open Championship

Results in major championships

CUT = missed the half-way cut
"T" = tied

Results in The Players Championship

CUT = missed the halfway cut
"T" indicates a tie for a place

Results in World Golf Championships

QF, R16, R32, R64 = Round in which player lost in match play
"T" = Tied

Team appearances
Presidents Cup (International Team): 2005
WGC-World Cup (representing Australia): 2005, 2006

See also
2000 Buy.com Tour graduates
2003 Nationwide Tour graduates

References

External links

Australian male golfers
PGA Tour golfers
Korn Ferry Tour graduates
Golfers from Melbourne
People from Tamworth, New South Wales
Sportsmen from New South Wales
Sportspeople from Mesa, Arizona
1972 births
Living people